Ashley Anne Kirilow (born 1987) is a Canadian who raised money to aid cancer sufferers, while pretending herself to be a cancer sufferer. When Kirilow's fraud was made public, her story was republished around the world.

Since her case became public Kirilow's fraud has been cited as a cautionary example of the dangers posed by online fund-raising campaigns.

Medical condition

In 2008 or 2009 Kirilow discovered a lump in her breast.
Although a biopsy showed the lump was benign, she told people she had cancer.

According to the Toronto Sun, psychotherapist Marc Feldman, a professor of psychiatry at the University of Alabama, suggested the kind of lies Kirilow told were often a sign an individual was manifesting Münchausen Syndrome by internet.

Kirilow was one of the examples of a mentally ill suspect offered in the textbook Criminal Profiling: An Introduction to Behavioral Evidence Analysis.

When she was sentenced, in April 2011, as part of his explanation for her relatively lenient sentence, Justice Fred Forsyth noted how young her biological parents were when she was born.

Legal status

Kirilow was charged with several counts of fraud with one count of fraud of over $5000. Kirilow and her supporters report receiving death threats.

In November 2010, Kirilow pled guilty to defrauding Donna Michalowski, a woman who had raised almost $7,400 for Kirilow.

Kirilow surrendered to the police on August 6, 2010.
Kirilow's father described growing suspicious of his daughter's cancer claims, and when she wouldn't supply details of her treatment, he told her he no longer believed she had cancer, and that he would report her to the police if she didn't surrender herself first.

Kirilow appeared several times in bail court, during her first weeks in custody.
Newspapers quoted former friends who explained that no one would post bail for her because everyone was too hurt and angry.  Kirilow's father explained that he had considered posting her bail, but decided that she had lied too many times.
On August 20, 2011, a recognizance of $5000 was pledged, and she was released on bail with supervision by the John Howard Society.

Kirilow's conditional sentence

The Winnipeg Free Press reported that Kirilow received a conditional sentence, no jail time.
Kirilow had not spent the year between her arrest and her sentencing in jail.
She spent that time in half-way houses and mental health facilities.
When explaining the conditional sentence the judge said sentences were ""not an instrument for the acting of public vengeance and retribution,"

Kirilow was sentenced to 10 months of house arrest, followed by five months where she would have a curfew.
During her ten months of house arrest she was to be allowed three hours a week for shopping for "necessities".
During her five months of curfew she would have to be at home between 10pm and 6am.
After her fifteen months of house arrest and curfew her sentence required her to do 100 hours of community service.  Her sentence explicitly barred her community service from including any duties connected with fund-raising for charities.
Kirilow was not fined, and did not have to pay restitution.

October 2011 shoplifting conviction

Kirilow was arrested by a grocery store security guard, on October 7, 2011, for attempting to steal $11 worth of cold medicine.
She pleaded guilty two weeks later to theft under $5,000.  She was sentenced to one further day in jail.
Kirilow was still serving her conditional sentence from her fraud conviction when she stole from the grocery store.

On November 10, 2011, she received an additional 30 days in jail for breaching terms of her conditional sentence.
Both the Toronto Sun and The Hamilton Spectator speculated that Kirilow's last conviction was a sign that underlying mental health issues were not being addressed.

Second accusation of parole violations

The Hamilton Spectator and CHCH TV reported that Kirilow appeared in court on February 8, 2012, for a second breach of her parole conditions.
The Hamilton Spectator speculated that Kirilow was risking having her parole revoked.

On March 2, 2012, The Hamilton Spectator confirmed that her conditional sentence had been revoked.
Ashley Kirilow was jailed for breaching her house arrest conditions by visiting her boyfriend.

Fundraising activities

Kirilow's Facebook page described a charity she said she set up, entitled Change for the Cure.
Kirilow appeared at benefit concerts, organized on her behalf.
Kirilow visited children in hospital, receiving cancer treatment.

Commentators speculated about the effect her Facebook fraud would have on other charities' online donations.

On October 13, 2010, Linda Nguyen reported on the efforts to raise funds for experimental treatment for Alexis Wronzberg, a young Toronto area woman who suffers from a rare form of Leukemia.
Wronzberg needed $300,000 for haplo-identical stem-cell therapy.
Wronzberg's father described concerns that Kirilow's fraud would discourage donations to their fund.
He said their fears did not materialize.  Nguyen also quoted a spokeswoman for the Canadian Cancer Society, who "could not say" whether donations had lagged for anti-cancer charities, due to Kirilow.

Kirilow has offered the explanation that she pretended to have cancer to make her family pay for an unhappy childhood.
Kirilow's parents divorced when she was young.
She lived with both parents, and her grandparents, switching custody multiple times.
Kirilow told her donors both that her parents were dead, and that they were drug
addicts who had disowned her.

In addition to the funds she solicited, she accepted a vacation at Disneyworld from a charity that sponsored visits to the resort from those who were at risk of dying.
Skateboard personality Rob Dyer's organization Skate4Cancer
financed
Kirilow's trip to Disneyworld.

Case information
According to reports, Kirilow was working as a receptionist at the Sutton Group Results Realty Inc. office in September 2008. She later revealed to her co-workers that she had been diagnosed with cancer. Hence, Michalowski organized a fundraiser in February 2009 at the Burlington bar Club 54. The fundraiser collected $7000.

Kirilow is also accused of further raising thousands of dollars for her own benefit through a charity called "Change for the Cure" on Facebook.
She had supposedly created the charity to fund cancer research. Kirilow told Toronto Star that she had lied about being terminally ill.

Kirilow was released under the supervision of the John Howard Society.
Kirilow's lawyer, Brendan Neill, appeared on her behalf in a Milton court on October 1, 2010.

Kirilow faced three additional charges of fraud under $5000 at her November 1 appearance. She pleaded guilty to the one charge of fraud over $599. After her court appearance, while trying to explain the scrutiny which the Kirilow's case triggered, the lawyer said:

Kirilow mentioned in the context of similar frauds

On November 5, 2010, the week that Kirilow pleaded guilty, Ontario Police announced the arrest of Jessica Ann Leeder, a 21-year-old Huntsville, Ontario woman, who is also accused of using Facebook to solicit funds to treat a non-existent cancer.
According to the Winnipeg Free Press Leeder too had shaved her head.

In December 2011 Maclean's magazine listed Kirilow in a year-end summary article subtitled, "From Norway gunman Anders Behring Breivik to cancer fraudster Ashley Kirilow: portraits of evil".
Maclean's called her the "photogenic queen" of cancer fraudsters, when it included her in a list that included Osama bin Laden and Russell Williams, a notorious sexual sadist and serial killer.

In 2012 and 2013 her case was compared with that of 29-year-old Calgary resident Kristopher Nicholas Cook, who falsely claimed to have brain cancer.

In 2013 Kirilow's case was compared with that of 35-year-old mother of three LeAnn Gorchinsky-Gripper, who falsely claimed she had ovarian cancer.

See also
Belle Gibson
Michael Guglielmucci cancer scandal
Munchausen's Syndrome

References

External links
"Change" for a Cure Facebook Page 
https://web.archive.org/web/20100818053828/http://gawker.com/5606395/the-elaborate-lucrative-cancer-lie-of-ashley-kirilow
http://www.digitaljournal.com/article/295682

Canadian fraudsters
Living people
1987 births
Place of birth missing (living people)